The Puertollano Solar Thermal Power Plant is a 50-megawatt (MW) concentrated solar thermal power station using parabolic trough, located near Puertollano in the Province of Ciudad Real, Spain. It is owned 90% by Iberdrola and 10% by IDEA. It uses 352 parabolic-cylinder collectors, with 120,000 parabolic mirrors and 13,000 absorber tubes.

Three additional sections are planned for operation beginning in 2013, Puertollano 2, 72 MW, Puertollano 3, 12.4 MW, and Puertollano 4, 50 MW.

See also 

List of solar thermal power stations
Renewable energy in the European Union
Solar power in Spain
Solar thermal energy
Wind power in Spain

References 

Solar power stations in Spain
Solar thermal energy
Energy in Castilla–La Mancha